Eslam Gamal is an Egyptian football player currently playing for Al Ittihad.

International career
Gamal has been called up for Egypt for the first time in 2016 for a friendly match against Guinea.

Honours

Club
Zamalek SC
Egyptian Premier League: 2014–2015
Egypt Cup (3): 2015, 2016,  2018
Egyptian Super Cup: 2016

References

External links
 
 

1989 births
Living people
Egyptian footballers
Association football defenders
Zamalek SC players
Ismaily SC players
Egyptian Premier League players